Gunung Sahari Utara is an administrative village in the Sawah Besar district of Indonesia. It has postal code of 10720.

See also
List of administrative villages of Jakarta

Administrative villages in Jakarta
Central Jakarta